Utah's 2nd congressional district currently serves Salt Lake City and the largely rural western and southern portions of Utah, including Saint George and Tooele. The current U.S. House Representative is Republican Chris Stewart.

A map of current 2012 district boundaries can be found at the Utah Lieutenant Governor's office page: http://elections.utah.gov/map/district-maps.

Voting
Results Under Current Lines (Since 2023)

Results Under Old Lines (2013-2023)

Results Under Old Lines (2003-2013)

List of members representing the district 
District borders are periodically redrawn and some district residences may no longer be in the current 2nd district.

Election results

1912
Note: The 1912 election consisted of an all-party election to the two at-large seats. Howell was elected to the first at-large seat, while Johnson was elected to the second at-large seat.

1914

1916

1918

1920

1922

1924

1926

1928

1930 (Special)

1930

1932

1934

1936

1938

1940

1942

1944

1946

1948

1950

1952

1954

1956

1958

1960

1962

1964

1966

1968

1970

1972

1974

1976

1978

1980

1982

1984

1986

1988

1990

1992

1994

1996

1998

2000

2002

2004

2006

2008

2010

2012

2014

2016

2018

2020

2022

Historical district boundaries

See also

Utah's congressional districts
List of United States congressional districts

References

 Congressional Biographical Directory of the United States 1774–present

02